, also known in English as Black Dawn, is a 2012 Japanese film directed by Kentarō Horikirizono and based on a novel by Iku Asō.

Cast
 Atsurō Watabe as Kenji Sumimoto (Nihongo: 澄本健二, Sumimoto Kenji)
 Kim Kang-woo as An Min-cheol (Hangul: 안민철, An Min-cheol/Nihongo: アン・ミンチョル, An Minchoru)
 Yōko Maki as Kaori (Nihongo: かおり, Kaori)
 Machiko Ono as Hina Matsuzawa (Nihongo: 松沢ひな, Matsuzawa Hina) 
 Min Tanaka as Masayoshi Jo (Nihongo: 城正義, Jō Masayoshi)
 Im Hyung-joon as Kim Jeong-soo (Hangul: 김정수, Gim Jeong-su/Nihongo: キム・ジョンス, Kimu Jonsu)
 Kenichi Endō as Toshiki Kurata (Nihongo: 倉田俊樹, Kurata Toshiki) 
 Kimiko Yo as Kumi Muramatsu (Nihongo: 村松久美, Muramatsu Kumi) 
 Ryo Ishibashi as Shotaro Ariga (Nihongo: 有賀章太郎, Ariga Shōtarō) 
 Toshiyuki Kitami as Ryoga Kanazawa (Nihongo: 金沢良賀 Kanazawa Ryōga) 
 Kenichi Takito as Shoma Hisano (Nihongo: 久野昌磨, Hisano Shōma) 
 Shibukawa Kiyohiko as Takuya Morinaga (Nihongo: 森永拓也, Morinaga Takuya) 
 Hana Toyoshima as Kotomi (Nihongo: ことみ, Kotomi)
 Lee Kyeong-Yeong as Choi Kil-Sun (Chosongul: 최길선, Choe Gil-seon/Nihongo: チェ・ギルソン, Che Giruson), a North Korean terrorist
 Park Won-sang as North Korean defector broker source
 Kim Eung-soo as Park Jong-sik (Hangul: 박종식, Bag Jong-sig/Nihongo: パク・ジョンシク, Paku Jonshiku)
 Kim Jae-Il as soldier

Production
The film was shot in Chiba, Japan and in Seoul and Busan, South Korea.

See also
 Gaiji Keisatsu

References

External links
  
 

2012 films
Films based on Japanese novels
Films shot in Busan
Films shot in Seoul
Tokyo Metropolitan Police Department in fiction
2010s Japanese films

ja:外事警察#映画